Fausto Pari (born 15 September 1962 in Savignano sul Rubicone) is a retired Italian professional footballer who played as a defender.

Honours
Internazionale
 Serie A champion: 1979–80 (on the squad, but did not play in any league games)

Sampdoria
 Serie A champion: 1990–91.
 Coppa Italia winner: 1984–85, 1987–88, 1988–89.
 Supercoppa Italiana winner: 1991.
 UEFA Cup Winners' Cup winner: 1989–90.

External links
Profile at Lega-Calcio.it

1962 births
Living people
People from Savignano sul Rubicone
Italian footballers
Italy youth international footballers
Italy under-21 international footballers
Serie A players
Serie C players
Serie D players
Inter Milan players
Parma Calcio 1913 players
U.C. Sampdoria players
S.S.C. Napoli players
Piacenza Calcio 1919 players
S.P.A.L. players
Modena F.C. players
A.C. Bellaria Igea Marina players
Forlì F.C. players

Association football defenders
Footballers from Emilia-Romagna
Sportspeople from the Province of Forlì-Cesena